The following lists events that happened during 2015 in Guatemala.

Incumbents
President: Otto Pérez Molina

Events
April 25-September 6 2015: The 2015 Guatemalan Revolution takes place and ousts the government. 

 
2010s in Guatemala
Guatemala
Guatemala
Years of the 21st century in Guatemala